Haug's worm lizard (Cynisca haugi) is a worm lizard species in the family Amphisbaenidae. It is endemic to Gabon.

References

Cynisca (lizard)
Reptiles described in 1904
Taxa named by François Mocquard
Endemic fauna of Gabon
Reptiles of Gabon